HMS Andromache was a 32-gun  fifth-rate frigate of the Royal Navy. She was launched in 1781 and served for 29 years until she was broken up in 1811.

Construction 
Andromache was ordered on 1 February 1780 and was laid down on June 1780 by William Barnard of Deptford Dockyard. She was launched on 17 November 1781 and was completed by February of the following year. The ship is named after Andromache in Greek mythology.

Career

West Indies 
In 1782 under the command of Captain George Anson Byron, Andromache headed a look-out squadron during the Battle of Saintes.

Thirteen years later in 1795, Andromache sailed through a hurricane off Bermuda where she was completely dismasted and suffered severe damage.

Mediterranean 
In 1796 under the command of Charles Manfield, Andromache engaged a 24-gun Algerine corsair after it mistook her for a Portuguese frigate. The corsair lost 64 crew before the vessel surrendered.

North America 
In 1799, Andromache sailed to North America where she would patrol the coast. On approach, both vessels were heavily damaged by grapeshot but they were able to successfully capture a single Spanish gunboat.

Fate 
After serving for nearly 30 years, Andromache was broken up in 1811 at Deptford Dockyard.

References 

Ships built in London
1781 ships
Fifth-rate frigates of the Royal Navy